Quiet storm is a late-night radio format.

Quiet Storm(s) or The Quiet Storm may also refer to:

Music
 Quiet Storm Records, a Hawaii-based record label
 A Quiet Storm, a 1975 album by Smokey Robinson, or the title song, "Quiet Storm"
 Quiet Storm (Cockney Rejects album), 1984
 Quiet Storm (Aly & Fila album), a 2010 trance album
 Quiet Storms: Romances for Flute and Harp, a 1988 album by Michael Hoppé
 "Quiet Storm" (song), a 1999 song by Mobb Deep

Others
 The Quiet Storm, a fictional radio show in some 1990s sketches on the TV program Saturday Night Live
 The Quiet Storm (film), a 2007 Icelandic drama
Quiet Storm (wrestler), Canadian professional wrestler

See also 
 Silent Storm (disambiguation)